Rodolfo Marcos Teófilo (6 May 1853 – 2 July 1932) was a Brazilian writer, poet, pharmacist, and sanitarian.

References

1853 births
1932 deaths